Yvonne Turner (born October 13, 1987) is an American-Hungarian professional basketball player for the Seattle Storm of the Women's National Basketball Association (WNBA) and for Çukurova Basketbol. She previously played with the Nebraska Cornhuskers women's basketball team from 2006 to 2010. Turner played professionally outside of the U.S. as well, including time in Australia, Ecuador, Germany, Hungary, Poland, Russia, Spain, Turkey. In Hungary during the 2016–17 season, she led the EuroLeague in scoring while playing with Uniqa Sopron. She has played the Phoenix Mercury, Minnesota Lynx, and the Atlanta Dream during her time in the WNBA.

Nebraska Statistics 
Source

Professional career

WNBA

Phoenix Mercury (2017-2019)
Turner made her WNBA debut in 2017 with Phoenix. She averaged 5.1 points and 12.8 minutes per game in her 34 appearances, which included four starts. Turner scored a season high of 18 on July 17 at Minnesota in a loss.

Minnesota Lynx
Turner signed a training camp contract on February 18, 2022, with the Minnesota Lynx. Turner was waived from camp on May 3, but was brought back on a hardship contract due to the Lynx having multiple players missing due to overseas commitments or injuries. Turner was released from her hardship contract with the Lynx on May 16, 2022.

Atlanta Dream
On June 23, 2022, Turner signed a hardship contract with the Dream. Turner appeared in 2 games for the Dream before being released from her Hardship Contract on June 27, 2022.

Phoenix Mercury (2022)
Turner signed with the Mercury on a Hardship Contract on August 8, 2022. The Mercury were able to sign her due to Diana Taurasi's season-ending injury.

WNBA career statistics

Regular season

|-
| align="left" | 2017
| align="left" | Phoenix
| 34 || 4 || 12.8 || .410 || .241 || .763 || 1.0 || 1.1 || 0.6 || 0.0 || 1.1 || 5.1 
|-
| align="left" | 2018
| align="left" | Phoenix
| 32 || 3 || 13.3 || .376 || .324 || .682 || 1.8 || 1.3 || 0.7 || 0.1 || 0.6 || 4.1
|-
| align="left" | 2019
| align="left" | Phoenix
| 29 || 14 || 20.5 || .343 || .329 || .878 || 2.8 || 2.3 || 0.6 || 0.1 || 2.0 || 6.4
|-
| align="left" | 2022
| align="left" | Minnesota
| 4 || 2 || 22.0 || .308 || .429 || .857 || 2.5 || 2.5 || 0.5 || 0.0 || 3.0 || 6.3
|-
| align="left" | 2022
| align="left" | Atlanta
| 2 || 0 || 8.0 || .000 || .000 || .500 || 1.0 || 0.5 || 0.5 || 0.0 || 0.5 || 0.5
|-
| align="left" | 2022
| align="left" | Phoenix
| 3 || 0 || 11.7 || .400 || .000 || 1.000 || 0.7 || 2.3 || 0.0 || 0.0 || 0.0 || 3.3 
|-
| align="left" | Career
| align="left" | 4 years, 3 teams
| 104 || 23 || 15.3 || .372 || .308 || .800 || 1.8 || 1.6 || 0.6 || 0.0 || 1.2 || 5.1

Playoffs

|-
| align="left" | 2017
| align="left" | Phoenix
| 5 || 5 || 23.8 || .548 || .529 || .857 || 2.4 || 1.6 || 1.0 || 0.0 || 1.0 || 9.8
|-
| align="left" | 2018
| align="left" | Phoenix
| 7 || 3 || 20.1 || .432 || .208 || .556 || 1.9 || 2.0 || 1.0 || 0.3 || 0.9 || 6.9
|-
| align="left" | 2019
| align="left" | Phoenix
| 1 || 0 || 19.0 || .200 || .000 || 1.000 || 4.0 || 3.0 || 1.0 || 0.0 || 2.0 || 6.0
|-
| align="left" | 2022
| align="left" | Phoenix
| 2 || 1 || 12.0 || .286 || .000 || .000 || 3.0 || 1.5 || 0.0 || 0.0 || 0.0 || 2.0
|-
| align="left" | Career
| align="left" | 4 years, 1 team
| 15 || 9 || 20.2 || .448 || .326 || .750 || 2.3 || 1.9 || 0.9 || 0.1 || 0.9 || 7.1

Personal
Turner grew up in Omaha, Nebraska and graduated from Bellevue East High School in Bellevue, Nebraska. She became one of the oldest players to make their debut in the WNBA when she signed with Phoenix.

References

External links
Nebraska Cornhuskers bio

1987 births
Living people
Hungarian women's basketball players
American women's basketball players
American emigrants to Hungary
American expatriate basketball people in Australia
American expatriate basketball people in Ecuador
American expatriate basketball people in Germany
American expatriate basketball people in Hungary
American expatriate basketball people in Poland
American expatriate basketball people in Russia
American expatriate basketball people in Spain
American expatriate basketball people in Turkey
Basketball players from Nebraska
Guards (basketball)
Minnesota Lynx players
Nebraska Cornhuskers women's basketball players
Phoenix Mercury players
Sportspeople from Omaha, Nebraska
People from Bellevue, Nebraska
People from Sarpy County, Nebraska